The Belgium national football team represents the country of Belgium in international association football. It is fielded by the Royal Belgian Football Association, the governing body of football in Belgium, and competes as a member of the Union of European Football Associations (UEFA), which encompasses the countries of Europe. As over 600 players have featured in the team since it started officially registering its players in 1904, only players with more than 20 official caps are included.

Despite the first Belgium international game taking place on 1 May 1904, the first player to reach 25 caps for his country was Armand Swartenbroeks, who played his 25th match against England on 1 November 1923.

All players with at least 35 caps are awarded a Medal of Recognition by the Belgian Football Association; also players whose careers are ended by an injury after 20 games receive this award.

Players
This list is about male Belgium national football team players with more than twenty appearances. For players with at least five caps, see List of Belgium international footballers (5–20 caps). For players with one to four caps, see List of Belgium international footballers (1–4 caps). For the current men's national team squad, see Belgium national football team#Current squad.

Appearances and goals are composed of FIFA World Cup and UEFA European Championship matches and each competition's required qualification matches, as well as UEFA Nations League matches and numerous international friendly tournaments and matches. Statistics correct as of 17 November 2021.

References

 
Association football player non-biographical articles